Kitching is a surname. Notable people with the surname include:

 Alan Kitching (typographic artist) (born 1940), British typographic artist
 Alan Kitching, British graphic designer
 Arthur Kitching (bishop) (1875–1960), Anglican missionary, bishop and author
 Arthur Kitching (politician) (1840–1919), English stockbroker and Liberal politician
 Audrey Kitching (born 1985), American model and fashion designer
 Belinda Kitching (born 1977), Australian footballer
 Christopher Kitching (born 1945), British archivist
 Colin Kitching (born 1936), Australian soccer player
 Colin Kitching, violinist for English band Centipede
 Fat Kitching (fl. 1938), Australian soccer player
 Fran Kitching (born 1998), English footballer
 Frederick Kitching (1886–1918), British athlete
 Gavin Kitching, British professor of international relations
 George Kitching (1910–1999), Canadian World War II general
 Harold Kitching (1885–1980), British rower
 Harry Kitching (1905–?), English footballer
 J. Howard Kitching (1838–1865), American Civil War Union Army officer
 Jack Kitching (1921–?), British rugby league footballer
 James Kitching (1922–2003), South African vertebrate palaeontologist
 John Alwyne Kitching (1908–1996), British biologist
 John Kitching (athlete), British athlete
 Kimberley Kitching (1970–2022), Australian politician
 Liam Kitching (born 1999), English footballer
 Mark Kitching (born 1995), English professional footballer
 Nigel Kitching (born 1959), British comic book artist
 Phil Kitching (born 1967), English professional footballer
 Theodore Kitching (1866–1930), British officer of the Salvation Army
 Wilfred Kitching (1893–1977), 7th General of the Salvation Army
 William and Alfred Kitching, British locomotive builders

See also
 Kitching Ridge, in Antarctica
 Kitchings, surname

English-language surnames